The St. Anne Chapel is a Roman Catholic chapel in Frenchtown, Saint Thomas, U.S. Virgin Islands, in the Diocese of St. Thomas in the Virgin Islands (Dioecesis Sancti Thomae in Insulis Virgineis).

It was opened and dedicated on December 25, 1921. It was built thanks to the promotion of Father John Guillo (who came from Michigan in 1918) and Paul Dugal. He celebrated his first communion in 1922, and later that same year, the first couple married there on 29 November.

References

Roman Catholic churches in the United States Virgin Islands
Roman Catholic churches completed in 1921
Christian organizations established in 1921
1921 establishments in the United States Virgin Islands
20th-century Roman Catholic church buildings in the United States
Roman Catholic Diocese of Saint Thomas
Saint Thomas, U.S. Virgin Islands